Deuda  (English language: Debt) is a 2004  Argentine documentary film directed and written by Jorge Lanata with Andrés G. Schaer. The film premiered on 7 October 2004 in Buenos Aires . The film was nominated for a number of Silver Condor awards for Best Documentary (Mejor Largometraje Documental) and Best Screenplay, Feature-Length Documentary (Mejor Guión Largometraje Documental) recognising directors Jorge Lanata and Andrés G. Schaer. At the 2005 World Soundtrack Awards the score musicians Andrés Goldstein and Daniel Tarrab were also nominated for an achievement award.

Synopsis
Deuda is the story of a pursuit the search for the responsible for the televised cry of hunger of Bárbara Flores, an eight-year-old Argentine girl. The film focuses on institutional corruption in Buenos Aires, Washington, the International Monetary Fund (IMF), the World Bank and general international bureaucratic lack of interest. The film also includes interviews with high ranking IMF officials including Anne Kreuger.

External links
 

2004 films
2000s Spanish-language films
Argentine documentary films
2004 documentary films
Documentary films about economics
Films distributed by Disney
2000s Argentine films